The 2007 San Francisco Giants season was the Giants' 125th year in Major League Baseball, their 50th year in San Francisco since their move from New York following the 1957 season, and their eighth at AT&T Park. The team finished in fifth place in the National League West with a 71–91 record, 19 games behind the Arizona Diamondbacks.
Their season began with the team attempting to return to the post-season for the first time since 2003. New manager Bruce Bochy was hired to help the club improve on a 76 win season in 2006.  Giants left fielder Barry Bonds entered 2007 with 21 home runs shy of tying Hank Aaron for most career home runs. On August 7, 2007, Bonds broke the all-time home run record with his 756th career home run and 22nd of the season. The rotation was bolstered by the arrival of Barry Zito, who was signed to the largest contract ever for a pitcher during the off-season. On September 21 it was revealed that Bonds would not return to the team following the 2007 season.

Regular season

Season standings

National League West

Record vs. opponents

Game log

|- style="background-color:#ffbbbb"
| 1 || April 3 || Padres || 7 - 0 || Peavy (1-0) || Zito (0-1) || || 42,773 || 0-1
|- style="background-color:#ffbbbb"
| 2 || April 4 || Padres || 5 - 3 || Meredith (1-0) || Hennessey (0-1) || Hoffman (1)|| 39,938 || 0-2
|- style="background-color:#bbffbb"
| 3 || April 5 || Padres || 5 - 3 || Morris (1-0) || Hensley (0-1)|| Benítez (1) || 37,914 || 1-2
|- style="background-color:#ffbbbb"
| 4 || April 6 || Dodgers || 2 - 1 || Penny (1-0) || Lowry (0-1) || Saito (2) || 43,146 || 1-3
|- style="background-color:#ffbbbb"
| 5 || April 7 || Dodgers || 4 - 1 || Lowe (1-1) || Ortiz (0-1) || Saito (3) || 42,098 || 1-4
|- style="background-color:#ffbbbb"
| 6 || April 8 || Dodgers || 10 - 4 || Wolf (1-1) || Zito (0-2) || || 39,343 || 1-5
|- style="background-color:#ffbbbb"
| 7 || April 9 || @ Padres || 1 - 0 || Young (1-0) || Cain (0-1) || Hoffman (2) || 31,388 || 1-6
|- style="background-color:#bbffbb"
| 8 || April 10 || @ Padres || 6 - 5 || Morris (2-0) || Hensley (0-2) || Benítez (2) || 28,878 || 2-6
|- style="background-color:#ffbbbb"
| 9 || April 11 || @ Padres || 4 - 0  || Maddux (1-1) || Lowry (0-2) ||  || 31,568 || 2-7
|- style="background-color:#bbffbb"
| 10 || April 13 || @ Pirates || 8 - 5 || Ortiz (1-1) || Duke (1-1)|| || 22,117 || 3-7
|- style="background-color:#bbbbbb"
| -- || April 14 || @ Pirates || colspan=5|Postponed (rain)  || 3-7
|- style="background-color:#bbbbbb"
| -- || April 15 || @ Pirates || colspan=5|Postponed (rain)  || 3-7
|- style="background-color:#bbffbb"
| 11 || April 16 || @ Rockies || 8 - 0 || Zito (1-2) || Francis (1-1) || || 18,222 || 4-7
|- style="background-color:#ffbbbb"
| 12 || April 17 || @ Rockies || 5 - 3 || Ramírez (1-0) || Correia (0-1) || Fuentes (3) || 18,207 || 4-8
|- style="background-color:#bbffbb"
| 13 || April 18 || Cardinals || 6 - 5  || Sánchez (1-0) || Hancock (0-1) || || 40,532 || 5-8
|- style="background-color:#bbffbb"
| 14 || April 19 || Cardinals || 6 - 2 || Lowry (1-2) || Wells (1-3) || Hennessey (1) || 37,398 || 6-8
|- style="background-color:#bbffbb"
| 15 || April 20 || D-backs || 4 - 2 || Ortiz (2-1) || Davis (1-2) || Benítez (3) || 39,010 || 7-8
|- style="background-color:#bbffbb"
| 16 || April 21 || D-backs || 1 - 0 || Zito (2-2) || González (1-2) || Benítez (4) || 36,281 || 8-8
|- style="background-color:#bbffbb"
| 17 || April 22 || D-backs || 2 - 1 || Cain (1-1) || Petit (0-1) || || 36,868 || 9-8
|- style="background-color:#bbffbb"
| 18 || April 24 || @ Dodgers || 5 - 3 || Morris (3-0) || Lowe (2-3) || Benítez (5) || 44,001 || 10-8
|- style="background-color:#bbffbb"
| 19 || April 25 || @ Dodgers || 6 -4  ||Lowry (2-2) ||Wolf (3-2) ||Benítez (6) || 43,963|| 11-8
|- style="background-color:#bbffbb"
| 20 || April 26 || @ Dodgers || 5 - 4 ||Correia (1-1) || Beimel (1-1) || Benítez (7)||56,000 || 12-8
|- style="background-color:#ffbbbb"
| 21 || April 27 || @ D-backs || 3 - 2 || Davis (2-2) || Zito (2-3) || Valverde (9) || 24,798 || 12-9
|- style="background-color:#ffbbbb"
| 22 || April 28 || @ D-backs || 5 - 4 || Nippert (1-0) || Chulk (0-1) || Valverde (10) || 32,147 || 12-10
|- style="background-color:#ffbbbb"
| 23 || April 29 || @ D-backs || 5 - 4 || Medders (1-0) || Morris (3-1) || Lyon (1) || 28,818 || 12-11
|- style="background-color:#bbffbb"
| 24 || April 30 || Rockies || 9 - 5 ||Lowry (3-2) ||Fogg (1-2) || || 34,689 || 13-11
|- style=""

|- style="background-color:#ffbbbb"
| 25 || May 1 || Rockies || 9 - 7 ||Árias (1-0) ||Ortiz (2-2) || Fuentes (5)|| 33,210|| 13-12
|- style="background-color:#bbffbb"
| 26 || May 2 || Rockies|| 5 - 3||Hennessey (1-1) ||Francis (1-4) || ||32,557 ||14-12
|- style="background-color:#ffbbbb"
| 27 || May 3 || Phillies || 9 - 7 || Eaton (3-2) || Cain (1-2) || Myers (1) || 33,466 || 14-13
|- style="background-color:#bbffbb"
| 28 || May 4 || Phillies || 6 - 2 || Morris (4-1) || Moyer (3-2) || || 39,265 || 15-13
|- style="background-color:#bbffbb"
| 29 || May 5 || Phillies || 9 - 4 || Lowry (4-2) || Lieber (1-1) || || 40,796 || 16-13
|- style="background-color:#ffbbbb"
| 30 || May 6 || Phillies || 8 - 5 || Hamels (4-1) || Chulk (0-2) || Myers (2) || 38,738 || 16-14
|- style="background-color:#bbffbb"
| 31 || May 7 || Mets || 9 - 4 ||Zito (3-3) ||Pérez (3-3) || ||37,365 || 17-14
|- style="background-color:#ffbbbb"
| 32 || May 8 || Mets || 4 - 1 || Glavine (4-1) || Cain (1-3) || Wagner (7) || 39,455 || 17-15
|- style="background-color:#ffbbbb"
| 33 || May 9 || Mets || 5 - 3 || Heilman (3-2) || Benítez (0-1) || Wagner (8) || 41,832 || 17-16
|- style="background-color:#ffbbbb"
| 34 || May 10 || @ Rockies || 5 - 3 || Cook (2-1) || Lowry (4-3) || Fuentes (9) || 20,120 || 17-17
|- style="background-color:#bbffbb"
| 35 || May 11 || @ Rockies || 8 - 3 || Lincecum (1-0) || Fogg (1-4) || || 26,162 || 18-17
|- style="background-color:#ffbbbb"
| 36 || May 12 || @ Rockies || 6 - 2 ||Francis (2-4) ||Zito (3-4) || ||33,569 ||18-18
|- style="background-color:#bbffbb"
| 37 || May 13 || @ Rockies || 15 - 2 ||Cain (2-3) ||Buchholz (1-2) || ||24,243 ||19-18
|- style="background-color:#ffbbbb"
| 38 || May 15 || @ Astros || 6 - 5  || Qualls (4-1) || Sánchez (1-1) || || 33,490 || 19-19
|- style="background-color:#ffbbbb"
| 39 || May 16 || @ Astros || 2 - 1 || Sampson (4-3) || Lowry (4-4) || Wheeler (9) || 33,533 || 19-20
|- style="background-color:#bbffbb"
| 40 || May 17 || @ Astros || 2 - 1  || Chulk (1-2) || Lidge (1-2) || Benítez (8) || 36,815 || 20-20
|- style="background-color:#ffbbbb"
| 41 || May 18 || @ Athletics || 15 - 3 || Gaudin (3-1) || Zito (3-5) || || 35,077 || 20-21
|- style="background-color:#ffbbbb"
| 42 || May 19 || @ Athletics || 4 - 2 || Haren (4-2) || Cain (2-4) || Embree (1) || 35,077 || 20-22
|- style="background-color:#bbffbb"
| 43 || May 20 || @ Athletics || 4 - 1 || Morris (5-1) || Kennedy (1-3) || || 35,077 || 21-22
|- style="background-color:#bbffbb"
| 44 || May 21 || Astros || 4 - 0 || Lowry (5-4) || Sampson (4-4) || || 35,768 || 22-22
|- style="background-color:#bbffbb"
| 45 || May 22 || Astros || 4 - 2 || Lincecum (2-0) || Oswalt (6-3) || Benítez (9) || 35,134 || 23-22
|- style="background-color:#bbffbb"
| 46 || May 23 || Astros || 9 - 1 || Zito (4-5) || Albers (1-4) || || 35,521 || 24-22
|- style="background-color:#ffbbbb"
| 47 || May 25 || Rockies || 5 - 3 || Affeldt (2-1) || Benítez (0-2) || Fuentes (14) || 41,274 || 24-23
|- style="background-color:#ffbbbb"
| 48 || May 26 || Rockies || 6 - 1 || Cook (4-1) || Morris (5-2) || || 38,212 || 24-24
|- style="background-color:#ffbbbb"
| 49 || May 27 || Rockies || 6 - 4  || Ramírez (2-1) || Kline (0-1) || Fuentes (15) || 41,708 || 24-25
|- style="background-color:#ffbbbb"
| 50 || May 29 || @ Mets || 5 - 4  || Smith (2-0) || Benítez  (0-3) || || 47,940 || 24-26
|- style="background-color:#bbffbb"
| 51 || May 30 || @ Mets || 3 - 0 || Zito (5-5) || Glavine (5-3) || Hennessey (2) || 41,395 || 25-26
|- style="background-color:#ffbbbb"
| 52 || May 31 || @ Mets || 4 - 2 || Hernández (3-1) || Cain (2-5) || Wagner (13) || 44,228 || 25-27
|- style=""

|- style="background-color:#bbffbb"
| 53 || June 1 || @ Phillies || 13 - 0 || Morris (6-2) || Eaton (5-4) || || 38,164 || 26-27
|- style="background-color:#ffbbbb"
| 54 || June 2 || @ Phillies || 5 - 2 || Hamels (8-2) || Lowry (5-5) || || 45,153 || 26-28
|- style="background-color:#ffbbbb"
| 55 || June 3 || @ Phillies || 9 - 8 || Alfonseca (3-1) || Correia (1-2) || || 39,293 || 26-29
|- style="background-color:#bbffbb"
| 56 || June 4 || @ Phillies || 8 - 1 || Zito (6-5) || Lieber (2-4) || || 33,967 || 27-29
|- style="background-color:#ffbbbb"
| 57 || June 5 || @ D-backs || 4 - 3  || Lyon (4-2) || Correia (1-3) || || 25,848 || 27-30
|- style="background-color:#ffbbbb"
| 58 || June 6 || @ D-backs || 1 - 0 || Webb (6-3) || Morris (6-3) || Valverde (21) || 24,398 || 27-31
|- style="background-color:#bbffbb"
| 59 || June 7 || @ D-backs || 5 - 4  || Taschner (1-0) || Medders (1-2) || Kline (1) || 21,984 || 28-31
|- style="background-color:#ffbbbb"
| 60 || June 8 || Athletics || 5 - 3  || Calero (1-4) || Hennessey (1-2) || Embree (6) || 42,427 || 28-32
|- style="background-color:#ffbbbb"
| 61 || June 9 || Athletics || 6 - 0 || Haren (7-2) || Zito (6-6) || || 42,526 || 28-33
|- style="background-color:#ffbbbb"
| 62 || June 10 || Athletics || 2 - 0 || Casilla (2-0) || Cain (2-6) || || 42,345 || 28-34
|- style="background-color:#bbffbb"
| 63 || June 11 || Blue Jays || 4 - 3 || Morris (7-3) || Towers (2-4) || || 38,030 || 29-34
|- style="background-color:#bbffbb"
| 64 || June 12 || Blue Jays || 3 - 2 || Lowry (6-5) || Burnett (5-6) || Hennessey (3) || 37,574 || 30-34
|- style="background-color:#ffbbbb"
| 65 || June 13 || Blue Jays || 7 - 4 || McGowan (3-2) || Lincecum (2-1) || Accardo (7) || 40,086 || 30-35
|- style="background-color:#ffbbbb"
| 66 || June 15 || @ Red Sox || 10 - 2 || Tavárez (4-4) || Zito (6-7) || || 36,508 || 30-36
|- style="background-color:#ffbbbb"
| 67 || June 16 || @ Red Sox || 1 - 0 || Matsuzaka (8-5) || Cain (2-7) || Papelbon (16) || 36,381 || 30-37
|- style="background-color:#ffbbbb"
| 68 || June 17 || @ Red Sox || 9 - 5 || Wakefield (7-7) || Morris (7-4) || || 36,137 || 30-38
|- style="background-color:#ffbbbb"
| 69 || June 18 || @ Brewers || 5 - 4 || Gallardo (1-0) || Lowry (6-6) || || 41,631 || 30-39
|- style="background-color:#ffbbbb"
| 70 || June 19 || @ Brewers || 6 - 2 || Sheets (8-3) || Lincecum (2-2) || || 35,238 || 30-40
|- style="background-color:#ffbbbb"
| 71 || June 20 || @ Brewers || 7 - 5 || Vargas (6-1) || Zito (6-8)|| Cordero (27) || 35,151 || 30-41
|- style="background-color:#ffbbbb"
| 72 || June 22 || Yankees || 7 - 3 || Vizcaíno (4-1) || Cain (2-8) || Rivera (9) || 43,425 || 30-42
|- style="background-color:#bbffbb"
| 73 || June 23 || Yankees ||  6 - 5  || Chulk (2-2) || Proctor (1-4) || || 43,485 || 31-42
|- style="background-color:#bbffbb"
| 74 || June 24 || Yankees || 7 - 2 || Lowry (7-6) || Mussina (3-5) || || 43,503 || 32-42
|- style="background-color:#bbffbb"
| 75 || June 25 || Padres || 4 - 3  || Chulk (3-2) || Hampson (2-2) || || 41,140 || 33-42
|- style="background-color:#ffbbbb"
| 76 || June 26 || Padres || 3 - 2  || Meredith (3-5) || Messenger (0-1) || Hoffman (20) || 41,329 || 33-43
|- style="background-color:#ffbbbb"
| 77 || June 27 || Padres || 4 - 2 || Maddux (7-4) || Cain (2-9) || Hoffman (21) || 42,527 || 33-44
|- style="background-color:#ffbbbb"
| 78 || June 29 || D-backs || 4 - 3  || Peña (3-1) || Hennessey (1-3) || Valverde (26) || 39,146 || 33-45
|- style="background-color:#bbffbb"
| 79 || June 30 || D-backs || 4 - 1 || Lowry (8-6) || Davis (5-9) || Hennessey (4) || 41,515 || 34-45
|- style=""

|- style="background-color:#bbffbb"
| 80 || July 1 || D-backs || 13 - 0 || Lincecum (3-2) || Owings (5-3) || || 42,154 || 35-45
|- style="background-color:#ffbbbb"
| 81 || July 3 || @ Reds || 7 - 3 || Harang (9-2) || Correia (1-4) || || 37,299 || 35-46
|- style="background-color:#bbffbb"
| 82 || July 4 || @ Reds || 9 - 5 || Cain (3-9) || Belisle (5-6) || || 24,092 || 36-46
|- style="background-color:#ffbbbb"
| 83 || July 5 || @ Reds || 6 - 3 || Arroyo (3-9) || Morris (7-5) || Weathers (16) || 30,080 || 36-47
|- style="background-color:#bbffbb"
| 84 || July 6 || @ Cardinals || 4 - 3 || Lowry (9-6) || Maroth (5-3) || Messenger (1) || 45,245 || 37-47
|- style="background-color:#bbffbb"
| 85 || July 7 || @ Cardinals || 7 - 6 || Lincecum (4-2) || Looper (6-7) || Hennessey (5) || 45,355 || 38-47
|- style="background-color:#ffbbbb"
| 86 || July 8 || @ Cardinals || 7 - 0 || Wellemeyer (3-2) || Zito (6-9) || || 44,613 || 38-48
|- style="background-color:#ffbbbb"
| 87 || July 13 || Dodgers || 9 - 1 || Billingsley (6-0) || Cain (3-10) || || 43,230 || 38-49
|- style="background-color:#ffbbbb"
| 88 || July 14 || Dodgers || 8 - 7  || Hendrickson (4-4) || Misch (0-1) || Seánez (1) || 43,452 || 38-50
|- style="background-color:#ffbbbb"
| 89 || July 15 || Dodgers || 5 - 3 || Tomko (2-7) || Lowry (9-7) || Saito (24) || 43,446 || 38-51
|- style="background-color:#ffbbbb"
| 90 || July 16 || @ Cubs || 3 - 2 || Hill (6-6) || Correia (1-5) || Howry (6) || 40,282 || 38-52
|- style="background-color:#bbffbb"
| 91 || July 17 || @ Cubs || 4 - 2 || Zito (7-9) || Marmol (2-1) || Hennessey (6) || 41,102 || 39-52
|- style="background-color:#ffbbbb"
| 92 || July 18 || @ Cubs || 12 - 1 || Zambrano (12-7) || Cain (3-11) || Gallagher (1) || 39,792 || 39-53
|- style="background-color:#ffbbbb"
| 93 || July 19 || @ Cubs || 9 - 8 || Lilly (10-4) || Morris (7-6) || Howry (7) || 40,198 || 39-54
|- style="background-color:#bbffbb"
| 94 || July 20 || @ Brewers || 8 - 4 || Lowry (10-7) || Villanueva (6-2) || || 43,121 || 40-54
|- style="background-color:#bbffbb"
| 95 || July 21 || @ Brewers || 8 - 0 || Lincecum (5-2) || Bush (8-8) || || 43,180 || 41-54
|- style="background-color:#ffbbbb"
| 96 || July 22 || @ Brewers || 7 - 5 || Vargas (8-2) || Zito (7-10) || Cordero (31) || 42,554 || 41-55
|- style="background-color:#ffbbbb"
| 97 || July 23 || Braves || 4 - 2 || Smoltz (10-5) || Cain (3-12) || Wickman (17) || 42,679 || 41-56
|- style="background-color:#ffbbbb"
| 98 || July 24 || Braves || 7 - 5  || Moylan (4-1) || Sánchez (1-2) || Yates (2) || 43,072 || 41-57
|- style="background-color:#bbffbb"
| 99 || July 25 || Braves || 2 - 1 || Lowry (11-7) || James (8-8) || Hennessey (7) || 42,834 || 42-57
|- style="background-color:#bbffbb"
| 100 || July 26 || Braves || 4 - 2 || Lincecum (6-2) || Carlyle (5-3)|| Hennessey (8) || 42,366 || 43-57
|- style="background-color:#bbffbb"
| 101 || July 27 || Marlins || 12 - 10 || Chulk (4-2) || Pinto (2-4) || ||42,831 || 44-57
|- style="background-color:#bbffbb"
| 102 || July 28 || Marlins || 4 - 3 || Taschner (2-0) || Gregg (0-4) || || 43,001 || 45-57
|- style="background-color:#ffbbbb"
| 103 || July 29 || Marlins || 8 - 5 || Mitre (5-5) || Morris (7-7) || Gregg (21) || 42,965 || 45-58
|- style="background-color:#bbffbb"
| 104 || July 31 || @ Dodgers || 3 - 1 || Lowry (12-7) || Penny (13-2) || Hennessey (9) || 56,000 || 46-58
|- style=""

|- style="background-color:#ffbbbb"
| 105 || August 1|| @ Dodgers || 6 - 8 || Broxton (4-2) || Messenger (1-3) || Saito (27) || 56,000 || 46-59
|- style="background-color:#bbffbb"
| 106 || August 2|| @ Dodgers || 4 - 2 || Zito (8-10) || Tomko (2-9) || Kline (2) || 56,000 || 47-59
|- style="background-color:#ffbbbb"
| 107 || August 3|| @ Padres || 3 - 4  || Bell (5-3) || Taschner (2-1) || || 43,523 || 47-60
|- style="background-color:#ffbbbb"
| 108 || August 4|| @ Padres || 2 - 3  || Meredith (4-5) || Messenger (1-4) || || 42,497 || 47-61
|- style="background-color:#ffbbbb"
| 109 || August 5|| @ Padres || 4 - 5 || Brocail (4-1) || Chulk (4-3) || Hoffman (29) || 42,438 || 47-62
|- style="background-color:#bbffbb"
| 110 || August 6 || Nationals || 3 - 2  || Hennessey (2-3) || King (1-1) || || 43,052 || 48-62
|- style="background-color:#ffbbbb"
| 111 || August 7 || Nationals || 6 - 8 || Schroder (1-0) || Correia (1-6) || Cordero (24) || 43,154 || 48-63
|- style="background-color:#bbffbb"
| 112 || August 8 || Nationals || 5 - 0 || Cain (4-12) || Redding (1-3) || || 42,991 || 49-63
|- style="background-color:#ffbbbb"
| 113 || August 9 || Nationals || 1 - 3 || Hanrahan (2-0) || Misch (0-2) || Cordero (25) || 41,555 || 49-64
|- style="background-color:#ffbbbb"
| 114 || August 10 || Pirates || 8 - 7 || Grabow (2-1) || Chulk (4-4) || Capps (10) || 41,923 || 49-65
|- style="background-color:#ffbbbb"
| 115 || August 11 || Pirates || 13 - 3 || Armas (2-3) || Lincecum (6-3) || || 43,105 || 49-66
|- style="background-color:#ffbbbb"
| 116 || August 12 || Pirates || 5 - 0 || Gorzelanny (11-6) || Zito (8-11) || || 41,976 || 49-67
|- style="background-color:#ffbbbb"
| 117 || August 13 || @ Pirates || 3 - 1 || Maholm (8-14) || Cain (4-13) || || || 49-68
|- style="background-color:#bbffbb"
| 118 || August 13 || @ Pirates || 10 - 3 || Lowry (13-7) || Youman (2-4) || || 25,434 || 50-68
|- style="background-color:#ffbbbb"
| 119 || August 14 || @ Braves || 5 - 4 || Wickman (3-2) || Kline (0-2) || || 36,186 || 50-69
|- style="background-color:#ffbbbb"
| 120 || August 15 || @ Braves || 6 - 3 || Hudson (14-5) || Ortiz (2-3) || Wickman (20) || 33,841 || 50-70
|- style="background-color:#bbffbb"
| 121 || August 16 || @ Braves || 9 - 3 || Lincecum (7-3) || James (9-9) || || 36,419 || 51-70
|- style="background-color:#bbffbb"
| 122 || August 17 || @ Marlins || 3 - 0 || Zito (9-11) || Olsen (9-10) || Hennessey (10) || 25,079 || 52-70
|- style="background-color:#bbffbb"
| 123 || August 18 || @ Marlins || 4 - 3 || Cain (5-13) || VandenHurk (3-4) || Hennessey (11) || 42,817 || 53-70
|- style="background-color:#bbffbb"
| 124 || August 19 || @ Marlins || 6 - 5 || Chulk (5-4) || Gardner (3-4) || Hennessey (12) || 15,351 || 54-70
|- style="background-color:#bbffbb"
| 125 || August 20 || @ Marlins || 8 - 7 || Taschner (3-1) || Wolf (0-1) || Wilson (1) || 10,907 || 55-70
|- style="background-color:#ffbbbb"
| 126 || August 21 || Cubs || 5 - 1 || Eyre (1-1) || Lincecum (7-4) || || 41,242 || 55-71
|- style="background-color:#ffbbbb"
| 127 || August 22 || Cubs || 4 - 2 || Marmol (3-1) || Misch (0-3) || Dempster (20) || 39,548 || 55-72
|- style="background-color:#bbffbb"
| 128 || August 23 || Cubs || 4 - 1 || Cain (6-13) || Zambrano (14-10) || Hennessey (13) || 41,558 || 56-72
|- style="background-color:#bbffbb"
| 129 || August 24 || Brewers || 11 - 6 || Lowry (14-7) || Capuano (5-11) || || 37,583 || 57-72
|- style="background-color:#bbffbb"
| 130 || August 25 || Brewers || 6 - 2 || Correia (2-6) || Gallardo (5-4) || Wilson (2) || 39,069 || 58-72
|- style="background-color:#bbffbb"
| 131 || August 26 || Brewers || 5 - 4 || Kline (1-2) || Linebrink (4-5) || Hennessey (14) || 40,997 || 59-72
|- style="background-color:#bbffbb"
| 132 || August 27 || Rockies || 4 - 1 || Wilson (1-0) || Julio (0-5) || Hennessey (15) || 35,726 || 60-72
|- style="background-color:#bbffbb"
| 133 || August 28 || Rockies || 3 - 1 || Cain (7-13) ||  Morales (0-2) || Hennessey (16) || 37,844 || 61-72
|- style="background-color:#ffbbbb"
| 134 || August 29 || Rockies || 8 - 0 || Francis (14-6) || Lowry (14-8) || || 38,397 || 61-73
|- style="background-color:#bbffbb"
| 135 || August 31 || @ Nationals || 3 - 2 || Correia (3-6) || Redding (3-5) || Hennessey (17) || 25,169 || 62-73
|- style=""

|- style="background-color:#ffbbbb"
| 136 || September 1 || @ Nationals || 4 - 1 || Hanrahan (4-2) || Sánchez (1-3) || Cordero (29) || 30,221 || 62-74
|- style="background-color:#ffbbbb"
| 137 || September 2 || @ Nationals || 2 - 1 || Cordero (3-3) || Wilson (1-1) || || 27,310 || 62-75
|- style="background-color:#ffbbbb"
| 138 || September 3 || @ Rockies || 7 - 4 || Francis (15-6) || Cain (7-14) || Corpas (13) || 30,168 || 62-76
|- style="background-color:#ffbbbb"
| 139 || September 4 || @ Rockies || 6 - 5 || Corpas (4-2) || Hennessey (2-4) || || 20,553 || 62-77
|- style="background-color:#bbffbb"
| 140 || September 5 || @ Rockies || 5 - 3 || Correia (4-6) || Jiménez (3-3) || Hennessey (18) || 22,157 || 63-77
|- style="background-color:#bbffbb"
| 141 || September 7 || Dodgers || 5 - 4 || Hennessey (3-4) || Broxton (4-3) || || 40,016 || 64-77
|- style="background-color:#ffbbbb"
| 142 || September 8 || Dodgers || 6 - 2 || Wells (7-8) || Zito (9-12) || || 42,228 || 64-78
|- style="background-color:#bbffbb"
| 143 || September 9 || Dodgers || 4 - 2 || Walker (1-0) || Beimel (4-2) || Hennessey (19) || 40,650 || 65-78
|- style="background-color:#ffbbbb"
| 144 || September 10 || D-backs || 5 - 3 || Peguero (1-0) || Hennessey (3-5) || Peña (2) || 33,498 || 65-79
|- style="background-color:#bbffbb"
| 145 || September 11 || D-backs || 2 - 1 || Walker (2-0) || Wickman (3-4) || Wilson (3) || 33,633 || 66-79
|- style="background-color:#ffbbbb"
| 146 || September 12 || D-backs || 9 - 4 || Webb (16-10) || Sánchez (1-4) || || 37,083 || 66-80
|- style="background-color:#ffbbbb"
| 147 || September 14 || @ Padres || 5 - 4  || Hoffman (4-4) || Giese (0-1) || || 32,053 || 66-81
|- style="background-color:#ffbbbb"
| 148 || September 15 || @ Padres || 6 - 0 || Tomko (3-11) || Cain (7-15) || || 41,554 || 66-82
|- style="background-color:#ffbbbb"
| 149 || September 16 || @ Padres || 5 - 1 || Peavy (18-6) || Lincecum (7-5) || || 34,000 || 66-83
|- style="background-color:#bbffbb"
| 150 || September 17 || @ D-backs || 8 - 5 || Munter (1-0) || Peña (5-4) || Wilson (4) || 31,122 || 67-83
|- style="background-color:#ffbbbb"
| 151 || September 18 || @ D-backs || 5 - 0 || Owings (7-8) || Sánchez (1-5) || || 44,220 || 67-84
|- style="background-color:#ffbbbb"
| 152 || September 19 || @ D-backs || 6 - 4 || Cruz (6-1) || Zito (9-13) || Valverde (46) || 42,855 || 67-85
|- style="background-color:#ffbbbb"
| 153 || September 20 || Reds || 4 - 2 || Bailey (3-2) || Cain (7-16) || Weathers (32) || 35,019 || 67-86
|- style="background-color:#ffbbbb"
| 154 || September 21 || Reds || 9 - 8  || McBeth (3-2) || Munter (1-1) || Weathers (33) || 35,502 || 67-87
|- style="background-color:#bbffbb"
| 155 || September 22 || Reds || 2 - 0 || Hennessey (4-5) || Bray (3-3) || Wilson (5) || 36,375 || 68-87
|- style="background-color:#bbffbb"
| 156 || September 23 || Reds || 5 - 4 || Messenger (2-4) || Harang (16-5) || Wilson (6) || 38,029 || 69-87
|- style="background-color:#bbffbb"
| 157 || September 24 || Padres || 9 - 4 || Zito (10-13) || Young (9-8) || || 35,650 || 70-87
|- style="background-color:#ffbbbb"
| 158 || September 25 || Padres || 6 - 4 || Thatcher (1-1) || Wilson (1-2) || Hoffman (41) || 35,524 || 70-88
|- style="background-color:#ffbbbb"
| 159 || September 26 || Padres || 11 - 3 || Peavy (19-6) || Misch (0-4) || || 42,926 || 70-89
|- style="background-color:#ffbbbb"
| 160 || September 28 || @ Dodgers || 8 - 3 || Wells (9-9) || Correia (4-7) || || 47,696 || 70-90
|- style="background-color:#ffbbbb"
| 161 || September 29 || @ Dodgers || 6 - 5  || Saito (2-1) || Giese (0-2) || || 51,983 || 70-91
|- style="background-color:#bbffbb"
| 162 || September 30 || @ Dodgers || 11 - 2 || Zito (11-13) || Stults (1-4) || || 49,211 || 71-91
|- style=""

Historic moments 

2007 was a year that had various milestones, whether personal, or historical in terms of team history, or MLB history.

May 
On May 7, 2007, Bengie Molina became the first Giant since Willie McCovey in 1977 to hit two home runs in one inning.  Ray Durham led off the fifth inning with a walk, and Molina followed the walk with a two-run home run to left field.  Rich Aurilia later hit a three-run homer, to make it a six-run inning.  Barry Bonds, and Durham then walked, and Molina came up and hit a three-run home run to left-center field, to finish a nine-run inning.

Later in May, on Mother's day, the 13th, rookie Fred Lewis hit for the cycle, in his 16th Major League game, becoming only the 22nd Giant to do so.  Lewis hit a double in the first inning, leading off the game, and hit his first major league home run, a three-run shot, in the third inning.  His triple came in the fifth inning, and he got the last leg of the cycle in the seventh inning.  Lewis was the first Giant to hit for the cycle since Randy Winn did it in Cincinnati on Aug 15, 2005.  He is only the fourth player in Major League history to hit his first home run as part of a cycle, joining, Cliff Heathcote, Gary Ward, and Luke Scott.  Heathcote accomplished this feat on June 13, 1918, Ward on September 18, 1980, and Scott on July 28, 2006.  He also became the first left-handed San Francisco Giants batter to hit for the cycle.

June 
Rookie Fred Lewis hit his first career grand slam against the Philadelphia Phillies on June 1, 2007.

July 
On July 4, 2007, Fred Lewis hit his second grand slam of the season, becoming the first rookie in San Francisco Giants history to hit two slams in one season.  Two of Lewis' first three career home runs were grand slams, and the other was part of a cycle.

August 
On August 4, 2007, Barry Bonds tied Hank Aaron for the most home runs in Major League history, when he hit his 755th career home run off of the San Diego Padres' Clay Hensley

Barry Bonds became the all-time home run leader at 8:51 pm PDT, on August 7, 2007, when he hit his 756th career home run off Mike Bascik and the Washington Nationals.  His milestone home run was hit just to the right of center field at AT&T Park.  A plaque commemorating his home run has since been placed on the wall near where his home run landed.

On August 8, Bonds added to his home run total, when he hit his 757th career homer into McCovey cove.  He hit it off of the Washington Nationals' Tim Redding.

September 
Barry Bonds hit his final home run of 2007 on September 5, bringing his career total to 762. This would be the final home run of his career.

Roster moves

April
The Giants made no notable roster moves during April.

May
May was a month full of injuries and roster-switches for the Giants.  On May 3, starting pitcher Russ Ortiz suffered elbow neuritis and was placed on the 15-day disabled list.  Second baseman Kevin Frandsen was recalled from the Giants' triple-A affiliate Fresno Grizzlies.  The very next day, May 4, reliever Scott Munter was recalled from Fresno and first baseman Lance Niekro was designated for assignment.  He cleared waivers and was sent down to Fresno on May 9.

On May 6, starter Tim Lincecum was recalled from Fresno and Scott Munter was sent down.  On May 10, Dave Roberts was placed on the 15-day disabled list due to elbow surgery and Todd Linden was designated for assignment.  Outfielders Dan Ortmeier and Fred Lewis were recalled from Fresno.

On May 21, Russ Ortiz came off the disabled list, forcing pitcher Jonathan Sánchez to be sent down to Fresno.  To end the month, the team's closer Armando Benítez was traded to the Marlins for pitcher Randy Messenger.

June
Russ Ortiz was once again placed on the 15-day disabled list on June 7 because of a strained right forearm. J Jonathan Sánchez was recalled, once again.  On June 9, catcher Eliézer Alfonzo was placed on the 15-day disabled list and Guillermo Rodríguez was recalled from Fresno.  Later that same day, outfielder Fred Lewis was placed on the 15-day disabled list because of a right oblique strain.  Outfielder Dave Roberts was recalled in his place.

July
On July 31, 2007, pitcher Matt Morris was traded to the Pittsburgh Pirates for center field prospect Rajai Davis and pitcher Stephen MacFarland.

Roster

Player stats

Batting

Starters by position
Note: Pos = Position; G = Games played; AB = At bats; H = Hits; Avg. = Batting average; HR = Home runs; RBI = Runs batted in

Other batters
Note: G = Games played; AB = At bats; H = Hits; Avg. = Batting average; HR = Home runs; RBI = Runs batted in

Pitching

Starting pitchers
Note: G = Games pitched; IP = Innings pitched; W = Wins; L = Losses; ERA = Earned run average; SO = Strikeouts

Other pitchers
Note: G = Games pitched; IP = Innings pitched; W = Wins; L = Losses; ERA = Earned run average; SO = Strikeouts

Relief pitchers
Note: G = Games pitched; W = Wins; L = Losses; SV = Saves; ERA = Earned run average; SO = Strikeouts

Awards and honors
 Bengie Molina C, Willie Mac Award

All Star Game
 Barry Bonds

Farm system

LEAGUE CHAMPIONS: San Jose, Salem-Keizer

References

External links
Game Logs:
1st Half: San Francisco Giants Game Log on ESPN.com
2nd Half: San Francisco Giants Game Log on ESPN.com
Batting Statistics: San Francisco Giants Batting Stats on ESPN.com
Pitching Statistics: San Francisco Giants Pitching Stats on ESPN.com
2007 San Francisco Giants at Baseball Reference

San Francisco Giants seasons
San Francisco Giants season
San Francisco Giants